Trollhättan Assembly is an automobile factory in Trollhättan, Sweden. The factory opened in 1947 under the ownership of Saab AB, then passing to Saab Automobile. From 1989 to 2010, the factory was partially (1989–1999), then completely (2000–2010) owned by General Motors. In 2010, Saab was sold to Spyker Cars. The plant ended production in 2011 and restarted in 2013, after the National Electric Vehicle Sweden purchase of Saab Automobile. The Trollhättan complex, including the assembly, is now the sole site of all Saab engineering and manufacturing activities.

It was founded on the site of Trollhättan airfield, by the aircraft manufacturer Svenska Aeroplan Aktiebolaget (Saab AB), an aircraft manufacturer since 1937 and based in Linköping, Sweden. The first automobile off the line was the Saab 92, a front-wheel drive, two-stroke, transverse-engined passenger vehicle.

Former products
 Saab 9-3 Sport Sedan (Based on the 2014 year model)
 Saab 9-3 EV Sport Sedan (Based on the 2014 year model)
 Saab 9-3 SportCombi and Convertible
 Saab 9-5 Sport sedan and SportCombi
 Saab 92
 Saab 93
 Saab 95 Combi
 Saab 96
 Saab 99
 Saab 90
 Saab 900
 Saab 9000
 Cadillac BLS

References

See also
 Saab Automobile
 List of GM factories
 GM Europe

General Motors factories
Motor vehicle assembly plants in Sweden
Buildings and structures in Västra Götaland County
1947 establishments in Sweden